John Wyndham Dawson (1 February 1928 – 11 March 2019) was a New Zealand botanist.

Early life and education
Dawson was born in Eketahuna on 1 February 1928. He was educated at Eketahuna District High School and Christchurch Boys' High School. He studied at Victoria University College from 1947 to 1952, graduating with a Master of Arts with second-class honours in 1953. He was then awarded a Fulbright Scholarship, and undertook doctoral studies at the University of California, Berkeley, from where he gained a PhD in January 1958. The title of his thesis was A revision of the genus Anisotome Hook f. (Umbelliferae).

In 1958, Dawson married Judith Macken, and the couple went on to have three children.

Career
In 1957, Dawson was appointed to the faculty of the Department of Botany at Victoria University College (from 1962 known as Victoria University of Wellington), and remained there until his retirement in 1988, having risen to the rank of associate professor. He served as head of the Botany Department between 1984 and 1987. Dawson was a Fellow of the Linnaean Society.

Dawson's research covered the characteristics, relationships and history of New Zealand plants. In particular, he was interested in the Umbelliferae family of alpine plants, and he also studied New Caledonian flora from the family Myrtaceae. After his retirement from Victoria, Dawson continued his botanical research in New Caledonia, he ran extension courses on the native plants of New Zealand, and was a guide at Otari-Wilton's Bush. Dawson's book, New Zealand's Native Trees, co-written with Rob Lucas, was named "Book of the Year" at the 2012 New Zealand Post Book Awards.

Death
Dawson died in Wellington on 11 March 2019.

References

1928 births
2019 deaths
People from Eketāhuna
Victoria University of Wellington alumni
UC Berkeley College of Natural Resources alumni
20th-century New Zealand botanists
Academic staff of the Victoria University of Wellington
21st-century New Zealand botanists
Fellows of the Linnean Society of London